Parke-Bernet Galleries was an American auction house, active from 1937 to 1964, when Sotheby's purchased it. The company was founded by a group of employees of the American Art Association, including Otto Bernet, Hiram H. Parke, Leslie A. Hyam, Lewis Marion and Mary Vandergrift. By 1964, the company was the largest auction house in America, with 115 employees and total sales of $11 million ($ million in ). That year, Sotheby's purchased a controlling interest of 75% in the gallery for $1.5 million ($ million in ).

History 
The company was founded in 1937, by a group of forty former employees of the American Art Association, including Otto Bernet, Hiram H. Parke, Leslie A. Hyam, Lewis Marion and Mary Vandergrift. In January 1938, the first auction was held in a gallery at 742 Fifth Avenue. The next year, the company took over the American Art Association-Anderson Galleries, consisting of the American Art Association and the Anderson Auction Company. The collection sold for over 2 million pounds in 1957, a record. Other customers of the company included Rockefellers, Vanderbilts, Paul Mellon and Henry Ford II. Ford's purchase of La Serre by Renoir through Parke-Bernet was a world record. Parke-Bernet also oversaw the sale of the estate of Hagop Kevorkian, the Armenian archaeologist, antiquities dealer, and philanthropist whose foundation gave major contributions to support the study of the Near East and Middle East at the University of Pennsylvania, New York University, and Columbia University.

Building 

The Parke-Bernet Galleries building is a building in New York City at 980 Madison Avenue that served as the headquarters of Parke-Bernet Galleries from its opening on November 10, 1949, to its sale in 1987.

Sources

American auction houses
Sotheby's
American companies established in 1937
Retail companies established in 1937
1937 establishments in New York (state)